Andre Begemann and Martin Emmrich were the defending champions, but Begemann chose not to participate this year. Emmrich played alongside Christopher Kas, but lost in the final to Santiago González and Scott Lipsky, 5–7, 6–4, [3–10].

Seeds

Draw

Draw

References
 Main Draw

Dusseldorf Openandnbsp;- Doubles
2014 Doubles
2014 in German tennis